Lalbihari Bhattacharya (1937/38 – 15 August 2019) was an Indian politician. He was elected as MLA of Barjora Vidhan Sabha Constituency in West Bengal Legislative Assembly in 1982. He died on 15 August 2019 at the age of 81.

References

1930s births
2019 deaths
Communist Party of India (Marxist) politicians
West Bengal MLAs 1982–1987